Rachel Carson (1907–1964) was a marine biologist and nature writer whose writings are credited with advancing the global environmental movement.

Rachel Carson may also refer to:
 Rachel Carson (film), an episode of American Experience series
 RV Rachel Carson (1977), a former naval gunboat, acquired by the Environmental Protection Agency in 1977 and later scrapped.
 RV Rachel Carson (2003), a former supply vessel, acquired by the Monterey Bay Aquarium Research Institute in 2011.
 RV Rachel Carson (2008), a Challenger-class research vessel, launched in 2008 and operated by the University of Maryland.
 Rachel Carson Bridge, a bridge across the Allegheny River in Pittsburgh, Pennsylvania
 Rachel Carson College, a residential college at the University of California, Santa Cruz
 Rachel Carson Greenway, a set of trails in Maryland
 Rachel Carson Middle School, in Virginia
 Rachel Carson National Wildlife Refuge, in Maine
 Rachel Carson Run, a tributary of the Allegheny River in Pennsylvania
 Rachel Carson Falls, formed by the above stream
 Rachel Carson Trail, a trail in Pennsylvania
 Statue of Rachel Carson, an outdoor sculpture by David Lewis in Woods Hole, Massachusetts, US

See also
 RV Rachel Carson, a list of research vessels named after Carson
 Rachel Carson Homestead, birthplace and childhood home in Pennsylvania of the environmentalist
 Rachel Carson House (Colesville, Maryland), adult home of the environmentalist
 Rachel Carson Prize (environmentalist award)
 Rachel Carson Prize (academic book prize)